Thomas Riveros Eugui (born 5 October 2001) is a Venezuelan footballer who plays as a goalkeeper for Carabobo.

Career
A product of the Deportivo La Guaira youth system, Riveros played for them in the Venezuelan top level and Universidad Central in the second level before joining Carabobo in 2021.

At international level, he was frequently called up to training sessions of the Venezuela under-20 national team.

Personal life
Riveros holds the Chilean nationality by descent, since his father and his paternal family are Chileans.

References

External links
 
 
 Thomas Riveros at FCCarabobo.com 

2001 births
Living people
Footballers from Caracas
Sportspeople of Chilean descent
Venezuelan footballers
Citizens of Chile through descent
Chilean footballers
Chilean expatriate footballers
Deportivo La Guaira players
Carabobo F.C. players
Venezuelan Segunda División players
Venezuelan Primera División players
Association football goalkeepers
Naturalized citizens of Chile